Mälar 25 is a  sailboat class and built in about 65 copies.

History
The Mälar 25 designed by Erik Nilsson won a design competition hosted by Mälarens Seglarförbund in 1948. The Mälar 25 was a response to the more and more expensive yachts built according to the Skerry cruiser rule.

See also
Mälar 22
Mälar 30

References

1940s sailboat type designs
Sailboat type designs by Swedish designers
Keelboats